Edi Baša (born 29 June 1993) is a Croatian football forward who plays for Albanian club Kukësi.

References

External links
 

1993 births
Living people
Sportspeople from Pula
Association football forwards
Croatian footballers
NK Istra 1961 players
NK Rovinj players
NK Jadran Poreč players
FK Željezničar Sarajevo players
HNK Cibalia players
NK Široki Brijeg players
NK Novigrad players
FC Koper players
Asteras Vlachioti F.C. players
FK Borec players
FK Kukësi players
Croatian Football League players
First Football League (Croatia) players
Premier League of Bosnia and Herzegovina players
Slovenian Second League players
Macedonian First Football League players
Kategoria Superiore players
Croatian expatriate footballers
Expatriate footballers in Bosnia and Herzegovina
Croatian expatriate sportspeople in Bosnia and Herzegovina
Expatriate footballers in Slovenia
Croatian expatriate sportspeople in Slovenia
Expatriate footballers in North Macedonia
Croatian expatriate sportspeople in North Macedonia
Expatriate footballers in Albania
Croatian expatriate sportspeople in Albania